Novitas-ROYAL (Research on Youth and Language) is a biannual open access peer-reviewed academic journal covering research and critical discussion about all aspects of language, linguistics, applied linguistics, and learning and teaching of foreign languages. The language of the journal is English, with each article including an abstract in Turkish. It is sponsored by the Children's Research Center (Ankara, Turkey). The editor-in-chief is Arda Arıkan (Akdeniz University, Turkey).

Abstracting and indexing 
Novitas-ROYAL is abstracted and indexed by:
 MLA International Bibliography
 Linguistics Abstracts
 Linguistics and Language Behaviour Abstracts
 EBSCO (Education Research Complete)

External links 
 

Linguistics journals
Biannual journals
English-language journals